Ridhi Dogra (born 22 September 1984) is an Indian actress known for her portrayal of Nisha Jindal in Woh Apna Sa , Nusrat in Asur, Astha in The Married Woman, Priya in Maryada: Lekin Kab Tak? and participation in Nach Baliye 6 and Fear Factor: Khatron Ke Khiladi 6.

Early life 
Dogra was born on 22 September 1984 in Delhi. She studied at Apeejay School, Sheikh Sarai in New Delhi and graduated in Psychology (Honours) from Kamala Nehru College.

Career 

Before she entered the television industry, Dogra was a dancer in the Shiamak Dawar Dance Institute. Her first job in the industry was as a co-producer on Zoom.

She has also hosted independence special show Azaadi for Life OK in 2012. In 2013, she participated in Nach Baliye 6. Dogra also played Savitri in Savitri, Aditi in Diya Aur Baati Hum, and Nisha in Woh Apna Sa.

The Married Woman, her latest web series directed by Sahir Raza, Dogra gathered critical acclaim and appreciation from her fans and audiences alike. The web series also features Monica Dogra in the lead role.

Personal life

Dogra married actor Raqesh Bapat in 2011. They separated and divorced in 2019.

Her brother is actor Akshay Dogra and her uncle was senior Bhartiya Janata Party politician Arun Jaitley.

Filmography

Television

Web series

Music videos

Films

Awards

References

External links
 

1984 births
Living people
Indian television actresses
Indian soap opera actresses
People from Delhi
Actresses from Delhi
Fear Factor: Khatron Ke Khiladi participants